The following is a list of notable Turkish Germans. This includes people of full or partial ethnic Turkish origin born in Germany, as well as ethnic Turkish immigrants who have arrived in Germany either from the Seljuk and Ottoman territories or from post-Ottoman modern nation-states (especially from the Republic of Turkey, but also from the Balkans, Cyprus, as well as other parts of the Levant and North Africa).

Most notable Turkish Germans originate from the Republic of Turkey; however, there are also notable Germans of ethnic Turkish origin who came from Seljuk Anatolia (e.g. ) and the Ottoman Empire (e.g. , Fatima Kariman and ). In addition, there are notable ethnic Turks who come from other post-Ottoman modern nation-states, especially from the Balkans (e.g. Ozan Güven, Filiz Osmanodja, Erol Sabanov, and Kemal Kurt are of Turkish Bulgarian origin; Hüdai Ülker is of Turkish Macedonian origin; Ateed and Cemile Giousouf are of Turkish Western Thracian origin), the island of Cyprus (e.g. Turgay Hilmi, Atesh Salih, and Rüya Taner are of Turkish Cypriot origin), the Levant (e.g.  is of Turkish Iraqi origin;  is of Turkish Syrian origin; and Bilal Aziz Özer is of Turkish Lebanese origin), etc.

This list is arranged alphabetically by surname following the Turkish alphabet arrangement. Notable ethnic Turks who originate from outside the modern borders of Turkey (i.e. from the Balkans, Cyprus, the Levant, etc.) are listed with their origin. Furthermore, individuals who are of partial Turkish origin are listed with their dual identity.

Academia and medicine
 
 
 

 
 
 
 
 
 
 
, political scientist; co-founder of the European Center for Constitutional and Human Rights 
Gülşen Aktaş, educator 
Ian F. Akyildiz, Chair Professor in Telecommunications 
, Professor of Computer Science at the Technical University of Berlin
, sociologist; Professor at the University of Frankfurt am Main
Götz Aly, journalist, historian and political scientist
, social scientist; lecturer at the HafenCity University Hamburg
, legal scholar and founding member of Dokuz Eylül University
Ülkü Azrak, Professor of Political Sciences 
, doctor and politician; co-founder and chairman of the Turkish-German Health Foundation
, doctor and art collector (Turkish father and German mother)
Rauf Ceylan, Professor of Sociology of Religion and of Migration at the University of Osnabrück
, psychiatrist
, co-founder of Qiagen
, Associate Professor of Classical Studies at the University of Waterloo 
, sociologist 
, political scientist
, ergonomist; editor-in-chief of the scientific journal Behaviour & Information Technology
, teaches at the University of Cologne
, founder of the Ararat-Verlag publishing house
, linguist and educational scientist 
, psychologist and sociologist
Semra Eren-Nijhar, sociologist 
, architect 
, doctor and philosopher
, Professor of Cardiology
, Professor of Electrical Engineering at the University of Siegen 
, physician
, Germanist (Turkish father and German mother)
Alexander Görlach, senior research associate at Cambridge University 
, Professor of Business Law at the Berlin School of Economics and Law
Onur Güntürkün,  Professor of Behavioral Neuroscience at Ruhr University Bochum
Dilek Gürsoy, heart surgeon; the first female surgeon in Europe to implant an artificial heart
, Professor of Law at the University of Hagen
, Professor of Turkish Literature at the University of Duisburg-Essen (1998-2009)
, philosopher and internist 
, Turkologist; Vice President for Internationality and Diversity at the University of Bremen (2011–17)
Necla Kelek, feminist and social scientist
,  Professor of Architecture and Civil Engineering at the Anhalt University of Applied Sciences
Caghan Kizil, neuroscientist and geneticist
, social scientist; managing director of Allianz Kulturstiftung (Turkish father and Macedonian mother) 
, sociologist; Professor at Leibniz Universität Hannover
, cardiologist
, historian and expert on the Ottoman Empire and modern Turkey
, Professor of Engineering at the Institute for Mechanical Engineering / Materials Science at the Ruhr West University of Applied Sciences
, Vice President of the University of Kassel (1986–90) 
, doctor and former politician  
, historian 
, chemist 
, geoscientists and Professor of Hydrogeology at the Free University of Berlin
, dentist; awarded the Bavarian Order of Merit in 2007  
Ziya Saylan, former president of the European Academy of Cosmetic Surgery
, Germanist, ancient historian, writer and translator
Uğur Şahin, Professor of Experimental Oncology at the University of Mainz; co-founder of BioNTech which developed the first approved messenger RNA-based vaccine against COVID-19
, former director of the Stiftung für Türkeistudien und Integrationsforschung and professor at the University of Essen
, literary scholar
, founder of SRH Berlin University of Applied Sciences
Sabriye Tenberken, tibetologist and co-founder of the organisation Braille Without Borders
, Turkologist
, Professor of Experimental Physics at the Technical University of Dortmund
Sefaattin Tongay, Professor of Materials Science and Engineering at Arizona State University
, Professor of Educational Sciences at Dortmund University of Applied Sciences and Arts
, director of the Zentrum für Islamische Theologie (Universität Tübingen) at the University of Tübingen
Özlem Türeci, physician and scientist; Privatdozentin at Johannes Gutenberg University; co-founder of BioNTech which developed the first approved messenger RNA-based vaccine against COVID-19
, political scientist
, Professor of Islamic Studies at the Osnabrück University
, psychologist; head of the Foundation Center for Turkish Studies and Integration Research
, Professor for Urban Development and Planning Practice at the Technical University of Cologne 
, doctor; he received the Order of Merit of Berlin in 1993
, Professor of Music Theory at the Robert Schumann Hochschule
, ethnologist
, Professor and Director of the Research Center for Turkish Law at the University of Erlangen–Nuremberg
, political scientist
, Germanist and literary critic (Turkish father and German mother)
, economist and sociologist; director of Harriet Taylor Mill Institute for Economics and Gender Studies at the Berlin School of Economics and Law
, Professor of German at Trakya University

Arts and literature
 

 

 
 
 
 

 
  
 
 
 

 

 
 

, author
, journalist 
, audio book speaker
, writer
, author
, theater director 
Doğan Akhanlı, historical novelist 
, author 
, writer, radio and television journalist
, journalist and writer 
, installation and performance artist
, journalist and writer
Hakan Albayrak, journalist and activist  
, author and migration policy expert
Ayşe Arman, journalist and columnist (Turkish father and a German mother)
, writer
, artist and painter 
, writer and poet
, journalist
, cabaret artist, satirist and performing artist 
Fatma Aydemir, author and journalist 
, author and campaigner; co-founder of Kanak Attak
, graffiti artist, breakdancer, and beatboxer
, cartoonist and satirist
Esmahan Aykol, novelist (Turkish Macedonian/Turkish Bulgarian father and Turkish mother)
, cabaret artist, book author, and integration activist
, author and social worker 
, author
, journalist and author
, writer 
Fakir Baykurt, author and trade unionist
, journalist and editor 
Habib Bektaş, writer
, writer
Şakir Bilgin, writer 
, journalist 
, cartoonist, playwright and journalist
, journalist and radio presenter
, author 
İnci Bürhaniye, co-founder of Binooki Verlag
, journalist
, poet
, early authors on the “Literature of Migrants” in Germany
, children's book author 
, author
, interior designer 
, journalist, author and pilot
Nevfel Cumart, writer, speaker, literary translator and journalist 
Sabri Çakır, poet 
, choreographer and interdisciplinary performance artist 
, journalist 
, author of children's and youth literature
Zehra Çırak, poet
, painter and graphic artist 
, writer and theatre actress 
, publisher and literary translator; founder of the Dağyeli Verlag publishing house
Güney Dal, writer 
, poet
, author of children's and youth literature
Adil Demirci, journalist 
, journalist
, architect
, theater director, cabaret artist, and author
, author
, journalist and author
, journalist, translator and author
, theater director 
Cengiz Doğu, poet and activist 
, author 
, author and translator 
, writer and doctor
, painter and object artist
, poet and translator from Russian into Turkish
, literary translator
, satirist
, writer 
, journalist 
, author and social worker 
İsmet Ergün, painter and stage designer
Aslı Erdoğan, writer and author
, theater director and author 
, author and journalist
Semra Ertan, writer and activist 
, author; managing board member of the Documentation Center and Museum about Migration in Germany
, author and journalist 
, journalist and poet
, children's book author
, mime artist, director and theater teacher  
, writer 
, artist 
, journalist 
, co-founder and board member of the à la turca theater 
, author 
, author
, painter
, journalist and publicist
, journalist, blogger, and activist 
, painter, sculptor, writer, and comedian 
, editor and literary translator; co-founder of Buntbuch-Verlag publishing house
, journalist; former head of the Turkish-language editorial team at Deutsche Welle
, journalist 
, journalist, publicist, and non-fiction author
Tatjana Gürbaca, opera director (Turkish father and Italian mother)
, author and poet 
, journalist 
, writer and playwright
Osman Kalin, built the Baumhaus an der Mauer in Berlin 
Celal Kandemiroglu, graphic artist 
Yadé Kara, writer 
, writer 
, theater director 
Suzan Emine Kaube, writer, painter and pedagogue
, writer and publicist
, writer 
Murat Kaya, comics author 
, comic artist 
, non-fiction author
, puppeteer; master of Karagöz and Hacivat
, sculptor and painter
Kemal Kurt, author, translator and photographer (Turkish Bulgarian origin)

, writer
Nuray Lale, writer
Şermin Langhoff, director of the Maxim Gorki Theater
, author and alternative practitioner in psychotherapy
Souad Mekhennet, journalist (Turkish mother and Moroccan father)
, dancer and choreographer 
, journalist (Turkish father and a German mother)
, cartoonist
, writer 
, cartoonist and founder of Kabarett Knobi-Bonbon
Aras Ören, writer
, journalist and author
Emine Sevgi Özdamar, dramatist and playwright 
, writer  
, poet 
, writer 
, poet and literary translator 
, journalist and deputy editor-in-chief of Business Insider
, author
, crime writer 
, novelist and non-fiction writer  
Ertuğrul Özkök, journalist
, author and translator 
, cabaret artist 
, writer and cabaret artist 
, cabaret artist 
Yüksel Pazarkaya, writer and translator
Akif Pirinçci, writer 
, author, journalist, and theater pedagogue 
, painter
, novelist 
, author 
, dancer 
, writer 
, writer
, 
, writer 
, author 
, journalist and author
, visual artist 
, journalist, radio presenter and writer 
, artist and author 
Murad Sezer, photographer 
, writer, publicist and journalist (Turkish father and German mother) 
, journalist 
Necmi Sönmez, curator, art critic and writer
, artist 
, writer and publicist
Asli Sungu, performance artist and painter
, journalist, author, and editor
, theater director; founder of Arkadaş Theater
, editor-in-chief of the magazine "Ayasofya" 
Nedim Şener, writer and journalist 
Zafer Şenocak, writer, translator, and poet 
, author; winner of the Olympe-de-Gouges-Preis in 2013 
, poet 
, writer and theater director 
, journalist and crime writer 
, author
, writer (Turkish mother and German father)
, writer, theater director and satirist
Arzu Toker, writer, journalist, publicist and translator 
, dancer and acrobat 
Canan Topçu, writer
, journalist 

, journalist and radio presenter
, photojournalist  
, journalist 
Şadi Üçüncü, writer
, theater director and cartoonist 
Hüdai Ülker, writer (Turkish Macedonian origin)
, writer
, journalist and photographer
Selma Wels, co-founder of Binooki Verlag
, non-fiction author 
, writer 
, writer (Turkish Cypriot origin) 
, theatre actor and theatre director 
, artistic performer and dancer
, literary critic 
, writer 
, comic artist and comic author 
Bahar Yilmaz, author
, author, interpreter, editor and publisher
, journalist and book author
, theater director
Deniz Yücel, journalist and publisher 
Feridun Zaimoğlu, author and visual artist
, journalist
, dancer and choreographer

"Booty Turks" (Beutetürken) and descendants
 
 
 
 
 (Haydar Ali) (ca. 1664/74 - 1716), Ottoman soldier and kammertürke ("chamber Turk") at the court of Elector Frederick I of Prussia
 Descendants:
 (1852-1913), classical philologist 
Götz Haydar Aly, journalist, historian and political scientist (1947–present)
 (1859-1932), architect 
Joseph Borgk (Yusuf), converted to Christianity and became a Lutheran pastor in a village near Windsheim
Augusta Marianna Cölestine Fatme (Fatma) (1664–1755), daughter of an Ottoman pasha; married to Count Friedrich Magnus zu Castell-Remlingen
Friedrich Wilhelm Hassan, kammertürke ("chamber Turk") of Sophia Charlotte of Hanover
, captured off Vienna in 1683 and served as "Chamber Turks" for Sophia of Hanover; their graves are the oldest surviving Islamic tombs in Germany dating to 1691
 (born Rabi or Rabia) (1677-1735), spent her life at the Electoral Saxon court and then as a Protestant pastor's wife 
 (ca.1660-1726), Ottoman Turk captured in 1685 and converted to Christianity 
descendants:
Johann Ludewig Mehmet von Königstreu (1709-1775), his grave slab is preserved on the north wall of the tower of St. Petri in Döhren-Wülfel
Georg Ludwig Mehmet von Königstreu, founded the Freemason Lodge Friedrich; served as a captain in the Guard Grenadier Corps
Sophie Caroline Mehmet von Königstreu, married to Georg August von Wangenheim
 (1735-1799), lieutenant general of the Electorate of Hanover
Ernst August Mustafa (1675-1738), valet of Elector Georg Ludwig
 (Mehmet Sadık Selim Sultan) (ca.1270-1328), believed to be the first documented Turkish German; he was baptized Christian in 1305
descendants:
Catharina Elisabeth Goethe (1731-1808), writer
Johann Wolfgang von Goethe (1749-1832), poet, playwright, novelist, scientist, statesman, theatre director, critic, and amateur artist
Cornelia Schlosser, was an Scribe and the only sibling of Johann Wolfgang von Goethe 
August von Goethe, served in the court of Karl August, Grand Duke of Saxe-Weimar-Eisenach
Walther von Goethe, composer and court chamberlain and the last living descendant of Johann Wolfgang von Goethe
Carl Soldan (1871–1931), pharmacist who founded the confectionery company "".
 (1870-1940), lawyer 
Heinrich Soldan, former mayor of Frankenberg   
Johann Soldan, former mayor of Frankenberg
 (1500–69), Gothic stonemason, wood carver, builder and painter 
Maria Aurora von Spiegel (Fatima Kariman) (born before 1685; died after 1725), Ottoman Turkish mistress of Augustus II the Strong
children:
Frederick Augustus Rutowsky (1702-1764), Saxon Field Marshal 
Maria Anna Katharina Rutowska (1706–1746), noblewoman 
Johann Ernst Nicolauß Strauss (Mehmet Sadullah Pascha), opened one of the first coffee houses in Germany in 1697 in Würzburg; he was baptized on June 24, 1695

Business
 
 
 
, entrepreneur; owner of Kanal Avrupa
Baklan (family), founders of the Baktat food manufacturing company 
, entrepreneur and former athlete 
, entrepreneur; co-founder of Sevenload
Hüseyin Gelis, CEO of Siemens Turkey
, entrepreneur; founder of MEG AG
, founder and director of European Games Group AG and Gründer der Playata GmbH; chairman of Computec Media (2005–09)
, entrepreneur 
Murat Günak, head of the Volkswagen design department (2004–07) 
, entrepreneur 
Adil Kaya, CEO of SIGOS
, entrepreneur; president and main partner of Türkgücü München
Kadir Nurman, restaurateur
, entrepreneur; CEO of "Global Digital Women"
, entrepreneur
Kemal Şahin, entrepreneur and a textile tycoon; founder of Şahinler Holding
, entrepreneur 
, entrepreneur; founder of the SRH Hochschule Berlin
Saygın Yalçın, entrepreneur
Avni Yerli, co-founder of Crytek
Cevat Yerli, co-founder of Crytek
Faruk Yerli, co-founder of Crytek
, entrepreneur

Cinema and television
 

 
 
 
 
  
 
 
 
 

 
 
 
 
 
 
 
 
 

 
 
 
 

 
 
 

Numan Acar, actor and film producer
, documentary filmmaker 
, actor 
Fatih Akin, film director, screenwriter and producer
Bülent Akinci, director and script writer
, actor 
Sinan Akkuş, director, writer and actor
, actor
Züli Aladağ, film director, film producer, and screenwriter (Turkish and Kurdish descent) 
, film director
Sinan Albayrak, actor 
Erden Alkan, actor 
, actor and model
, TV presenter 
Jale Arıkan, film and television actress
, actor
Thomas Arslan, film director 
Yılmaz Arslan, film director 
, actor
, model for Playboy
Django Asül, actor and comedian 
Erdoğan Atalay, actor 
Pinar Atalay, television and radio presenter 
, actor
, actor
, documentary director 
, film director and screenwriter
, actress 
Tayfun Bademsoy, actor
Almila Bagriacik, actress 
, winner of Ich bin ein Star – Holt mich hier raus! (season 10)
, actress 
Tevfik Başer, film director and screenwriter
, stand-up-comedian
, actor 
Sertan Baykara, broadcast journalist and presenter 
, director and screenwriter 
Aslı Bayram, actress and winner of Miss Germany (2005)
, actress and model
, documentary filmmaker
, actress 
, dancer and Playboy model
, actor 
, actress
, actress 
, film director and screenwriter
, actor 
, actor 
, actress 
, actor (Turkish, Kurdish, and Armenian origin)
, actress 
, actor 
, actress (Turkish father and German mother)
, director, screenwriter and film producer
, actress 
, comedian 
, actor 
, actress
Bülent Ceylan, comedian (Turkish father and German mother) 
, comedian, actor, presenter and model
, entertainer 
, film maker
Serkan Çayoğlu, actor 
Fırat Çelik, actor
, actor 
Bora Dağtekin, screenwriter (Turkish father and German mother) 
, actress
, actress 
, winner of Miss Turkey (2012)
Baki Davrak, actor 
, actress and producer 
, director and screenwriter
Renan Demirkan, actress 
, actor (Turkish Macedonian origin) 
, actor  
, director
, film maker
, actor 
, filmmaker
, comedian
, actor 
, director and film producer
Şebnem Dönmez, actress, TV host, and former model 
, actress 
Ercan Durmaz, actor 
, actor 
Hülya Duyar, actress 
, comedian 
, actress and film producer
Nazan Eckes, TV presenter 
, actor 
, actor
Şiir Eloğlu, actress 
Erhan Emre, actor 
, actress 
, actress  
Selma Ergeç, actress 
, actress
, actress 
Vedat Erincin, actor 
, actress
, actor 
, screenwriter; created the KDD – Kriminaldauerdienst television series 
, actor
, actress 
Fahriye Evcen, actress 
Özay Fecht, actress 
Nur Fettahoğlu, actress 
, voice actress 
, director and screenwriter (Turkish father and German mother)
, actor 
Jasmin Gerat, actress (Turkish father and German mother)
, silent film actress and dancer
, film director and screenwriter
, film director and screenwriter (Turkish mother and German father)
Demir Gökgöl, actor 
Demet Gül, actress 
, television journalist, documentary filmmaker and writer
, actor, stuntman and director 
, actor 
Ozan Güven, actor (Turkish Bulgarian origin)
, actor 
Lilli Hollunder, actress (Turkish mother and German father)
Lilay Huser, actress 
, actress 
, actor 
, actor 
Yasin Islek, actor
, actor (Turkish father and German mother)
, actor 
Arman İnci, actor 
, actor 
, documentary film director and film editor  
, actress 
İlker Kaleli, actor 
Gülcan Kamps, TV presenter 
Meltem Kaptan, actress and comedian 
, actor and director 
, actor 
Nefise Karatay, actress, TV presenter, and model 
Lale Karci, actress and model
, director, screenwriter and film producer
, actor
Aykut Kayacık, actor 
Sibel Kekilli, actress 
Berrin Keklikler, winner of Miss Universe Turkey 2013 
, actor and filmmaker
, director
, actress 
, director, screenwriter, actor, playwright and producer
Nursel Köse, actress
Asuman Krause, actress, TV presenter, and model (Turkish mother and German father)  
, filmmaker, journalist and translator
, director 
Mehmet Kurtuluş, actor 
Tekin Kurtuluş, actor 
, filmmaker and actor 
, actor 
Devrim Lingnau, actress (Turkish father and a German mother)
, reality show actress
, winner of Miss Germany (1996) (Turkish Iraqi origin)
, filmmaker, journalist and presenter (Turkish father and German mother)
Adnan Maral, actor 
, documentary film producer 
Maxim Mehmet, actor 
Sema Meray, actress 
Erdal Merdan, actor 
, actor 
, filmmaker and playwright
, television presenter
, actress and model
Denis Moschitto, actor (Turkish mother and Italian father) 
Gandi Mukli, actor (Turkish Syrian origin)
, actor
, film director
, film director 
Baran bo Odar, film and television director and screenwriter (Turkish mother and Russian father)
, actor 
, film maker 
, actor and film producer (Turkish Macedonian origin) 
, filmmaker 
Özgür Özata, actor 
, actor
Ercan Özçelik, actor 
Oktay Özdemir, actor 
, TV presenter
, director and screenwriter 
Gülsel Özkan, film director and screenwriter
, actress 
Okan Patirer, actor 
Meral Perin, actress 
, filmmaker and actress 
Haluk Piyes, actor 
Ayşe Polat, script writer and film director (Turkish and Kurdish origin)
, actress 
, actress
, actress 
Ayse Romey, actress
, actor 
, film producer and actor 
, actor 
, actor  
, puppet cartoon director (Turkish and American origin)
, film director 
Erol Sander, actor 
, broadcasting manager of Kanal Avrupa
, television journalist and presenter
, actor 
, actor
Jennifer Şebnem Schaefer, actress, TV presenter, and model (Turkish mother and German father)
, news anchor and television presenter  
, actor 
Nezâ Selbuz, actress 
, pornographic actor 
, actor
Tim Seyfi, actor 
, actor 
, actor and model
, actor 
, actor 
, actress 
, actor
, TV writer and journalist 
, comedian 
, actress and LGBT activist 
, actress 
, film maker (Turkish father and German mother)
, film maker
Hilmi Sözer, actor 
, actor 
Sıla Şahin, actress 
, film maker 
Türkiz Talay, actress 
, television presenter
, filmmaker 
, actor (Turkish father and German mother)
, actor 
Aylin Tezel, actress and dancer 
, actor  
, comedian (Turkish father and German mother)
, actress 
, actor
Leyla Lydia Tuğutlu, actress, model, and winner of Miss Turkey (2008) (Turkish father and German mother)
, director and screenwriter
, actor 
, actor
, actor  
Meryem Uzerli, actress (Turkish father and German mother) 
, actor 
, actor 
, film director, screenwriter, film producer, editor and actor 
, actor
Birol Ünel, actor 
İdil Üner, actress 
, actress
, TV and radio presenter 
Funda Vanroy, TV presenter and actress 
Marcus Vetter, documentary filmmaker (Turkish father and German mother)
Kaya Yanar, comedian 
, actress 
Mennan Yapo, director, screenwriter, producer and actor
, comedian 
Fahri Yardım, actor 
Erol Yesilkaya, screenwriter
Özgür Yıldırım, film director
, actor
, actor 
, actor
, actor 
Mürtüz Yolcu, actor 
, actor 
Belhe Zaimoğlu, actress 
Haydar Zorlu, actor

Fashion
, fashion designer 
, fashion designer

Food

, Michelin star chef (Turkish father and German mother)
, restaurateur
, Michelin star chef
Attila Hildmann, celebrity chef
, restaurateur and author of cookbooks on Turkish cuisine
, runs Germany's most successful YouTube channel on cooking and baking
, celebrity chef

Law
 
, the first Berliner with Turkish roots to serve as a judge at the Constitutional Court of the State of Berlin
, legal scholar
, lawyer
, lawyer and politician 
, father who fought for the right of access to his son after the German mother unilaterally released him for adoption after giving birth without Görgülü's knowledge; the case reached the European Court of Human Rights 
, lawyer and entrepreneur
, lawyer and legal advisor to the DITIB Federal Association (2014–17)
, lawyer and federal manager of the German Fire Brigade Association
Sinan Selen, lawyer; Vice President of the Federal Office for the Protection of the Constitution (2019–present)
, lawyer and general secretary of the Central Council of Muslims in Germany (ZMD)
, lawyer and sports agent

Military
, Ottoman prisoners of war 
Karl Boy-Ed, naval attaché to the German embassy in Washington during World War I (Turkish father and German mother)
Frederick Augustus Rutowsky, Saxon Field Marshal (Ottoman Turkish mother and Polish father)

Music

 
 
 
 

 
 
 
 
 
 
 
 
 
 
 
 
 
 

, rapper 
, DSDS Finalist 2014
Aydo Abay, singer and songwriter 
, music producer, composer, and songwriter
, rapper 
, singer, songwriter, composer, and DJ 
Tansel Akzeybek, operatic tenor
, rapper 
, rapper
Apache 207, rapper 
, music producer 
, R&B singer 
, composer, arranger, and music producer
Aylin Aslım, singer and songwriter 
Ateed, singer (Turkish Western Thracian mother and Iranian father) 
, rap duo 
Aynur Aydın, singer and songwriter 
, rock and electronic musician
, musician
, rapper 
, rapper
, rapper 
, musician (Turkish mother and a Kurdish father)
, singer and composer
, hip-hop producer (Turkish and Algerian origin)
Bernd Begemann, singer, guitarist and entertainer (Turkish father and German mother)
, rapper
 (Turkish, Armenian and Kurdish origin)
Capo, rapper (Turkish mother and Kurdish father)
, rapper 
, opera singer 
Cartel, rap group 
Summer Cem, rapper 
, singer and songwriter 
, rapper and singer 
, singer 
, musicologist
, rapper 
Işın Çakmakcıoğlu, violinist and a member of the Melbourne Symphony Orchestra  (Turkish German origin)
Kazım Çalışgan, musician; part of the Çalışgan & Heuser duo 
, pianist
Esra Dalfidan, jazz singer 
Elif Demirezer, pop singer 
Atiye Deniz, singer
, folk group
Parah Dice, DJ and record producer
Kemal Dinç, folk artist 
, singer
Güler Duman, singer, songwriter, and composer
Erci E, rapper 
Akın Eldes, guitarist 
Emre Elivar, concert pianist
Ercandize, rapper 
Erci E, musician, producer and radio host 
Simone Eriksrud, musician, singer and composer (Turkish father and a German mother)
, songwriter and bookseller 
Len Faki, DJ and music producer 
Eko Fresh, rapper (Turkish father and Kurdish mother) 
Islamic Force, Oriental hip hop group 
, hip-hop duo
, rapper
, jazz pianist (Turkish father and German mother)
, DSDS Finalist 2017
, R&B singer 
, rapper
Alpa Gun, rapper
, singer
, composer, conductor and pianist of classical music
, music producer 
, musician
Haftbefehl, rapper (Turkish mother and Kurdish father)
Killa Hakan, rapper 
Hava, rapper (Turkish father and Bosnian mother)
, musician and composer
, rapper (Turkish mother and Italian father)
Turgay Hilmi, French horn player (Turkish Cypriot origin)
, rapper 
, DJ
, rapper 
, rapper (Turkish father and Spanish mother)
, rapper
, singer 
Gültekin Kaan, musician and singer
, musician and singer-songwriter
, songwriter and folk singer 
, musician, songwriter, lyricist, director and music producer 
, rap group
Timur Karakuş, lead singer of the rock band Schöngeist 
Martin Kesici, singer and songwriter (Turkish father and German mother) 
, pianist 
Bahar Kizil, singer 
, rock group
Deniz Koyu, disc jockey and electronic dance music producer
, rapper 
Alev Lenz, record producer, singer/songwriter and composer (Turkish mother and German father) 
, music band
, musician
, rapper 
, rap group (Turkish and Italian members)
Massaka, rapper 
, singer, rapper and songwriter
, musician
Mero, rapper 
, rapper 
, rapper 
, rapper (Turkish father and German mother)
MOK, rapper 
, singer
Muhabbet, singer 
Ozan Musluoğlu, member of Athena 
Engin Nurşani, folk musician
, rapper and songwriter 
, DJ (Turkish father and a Finnish mother)
Cem Oral, musician (Turkish father and Finnish mother) 
Nilüfer Örer, pop singer 
, singer and saz player 
Engin Öztürk, musician
Hande Özyürek,
Da Crime Posse, Oriental hip-hop group 
, singer and rapper 
, producer and rapper 
DJ Quicksilver, DJ and music producer
, singer, rapper, songwriter and producer 
Rafet el Roman, singer
Freddy Sahin-Scholl, singer and composer (Turkish-German mother)
DJ Sakin, trance music producer
Kool Savas, (Turkish father and German mother) 
, singer and composer 
, folk musician 
Benyamin Sönmez, classical cellist
Pamela Spence, singer (Turkish mother and American father) 
Muhammed Suiçmez, member of Necrophagist
, jazz musician
Reyhan Şahin, rapper, linguist and former radio host 
Sürpriz, pop group; represented Germany in the Eurovision Song Contest 1999
Mousse T., DJ and record producer
, rapper, hip-hop musician and producer  
, singer, rapper, and hip-hop musician  
Rüya Taner, pianist (Turkish Cypriot origin)
, band 
Tarkan Tevetoğlu, singer and songwriter 
, rapper 
, folk poet 
, music producer and DJ 
, songwriter 
Ufo361, rapper 
, former member of Jamatami; pop singer, dancer, choreographer and model
, rock band
, pop singer
, pop singer 
İsmail YK, pop singer
Meriç Yurdatapan, jazz singer
, music producer and managing director of the music label Plak Music

Politics

 
 
 
 
 
 
 
 
 
 
 
 
 

, member of the SPD
, member of the SPD
Lale Akgün, member of the SPD
, member of the Greens
, former General Secretary of the Türkische Gemeinde in Deutschland
Selin Arikoglu, member of the Greens
, member of the CDU
, member of the Greens
, political scientist; works for the CDU's Konrad Adenauer Foundation
Nezahat Baradari, member of the SPD
, member of the SPD
, member of the Greens
Danyal Bayaz, member of the Greens (Turkish father and German mother)
, member of the SPD
, member of the SPD
, member of the CDU; doctor 
, member of the SPD
, member of the Greens
, member of the SPD
, member of the Greens
, former member of the Greens and the SPD; MEP (2000–04); Turkish ambassador to Austria (2020–present)
Ezhar Cezairli, member of the CDU
, member of the SPD
, former press spokesman and board member of the WASG
, director for Institutional Relations in the Berlin office of the Open Society Foundations 
, member of the SPD
Sevim Çelebi-Gottschlich, member of the Greens; the first MP of Turkish origin in a German parliament
, member of the Left; Vice President of the Hamburg Parliament 
, chairman of the Türkische Gemeinde in Deutschland (2014–present) 
, former member of the FDP; lawyer
Ekin Deligöz, member of the Greens
Hakan Demir (politician), member of the SPD
, member of the CDU
, member of the Greens
, member of the Greens
, member of the Greens
, member of the Greens
, member of the Greens
, former member of the SPD and current member of the AKP
Engin Eroglu, Chairman of the Free Voters Hesse and the Vice-Chairman of Free Voters; MEP (2019–present)
Ismail Ertug, member of the SPD; MEP (2009–present)
Zübeyde Feldmann, First Lady of Frankfurt; married to Peter Feldmann who is the Mayor of Frankfurt-am-Main
Cemile Giousouf, member of the CDU (Turkish Western Thracian origin)
, member of the Greens; deputy chairman of the Türkische Gemeinde Hamburg und Umgebung (TGH)
, former member of the Greens and current member of the SPD
Serap Güler, member of the CDU
, member of the Left
, member of the SPD
, member of the SPD
, member of the SPD
Ates Gürpinar, deputy chairmen of the Left (Turkish father and German mother)
Metin Hakverdi, member of the SPD
, anti-discrimination officer of the Berlin Senate Department for Education, Youth and Family 
Timur Husein, member of the CDU (Turkish Macedonian father and Croatian mother)
Uğur Işılak, member of the AKP
, member of the SPD
Dilek Kalayci, member of the SPD
Macit Karaahmetoǧlu, member of the SPD
, member of the Left 
, member of the Left
, member of the SPD
, member of the SPD
Hakkı Keskin, member of the Left; former chairman of the Türkische Gemeinde in Deutschland (1995-2005) 
, member of the CDU
Akif Çağatay Kılıç, member of the AKP
, member of the Greens
Cansel Kızıltepe, member of the SPD
, member of the SPD (Turkish father and German mother)
, member of the SPD; former chairman of the Türkische Gemeinde in Deutschland (2005–14) 
Elvan Korkmaz, member of the SPD
, member of the CHP (Turkish father and German mother)
, member of the SPD
Serpil Midyatli, member of the SPD
Özcan Mutlu, member of the Greens 
Belit Onay, member of the Greens; Mayor of Hanover (2019–present) 
, member of the SPD; MEP (1989–94)
, former member of the FDP; doctor 
, former migrant advisor 
Vural Öger, member of the SPD; MEP (2004–09)
, member of the SPD 
, member of the SPD
, former chairman of the Türkische Gemeinde in Deutschland (1994–95) 
Timur Özcan, member of the SPD; Mayor of Walzbachtal (2019–present)
, member of the Greens
Cem Özdemir, member of the Greens (Turkish mother and Circassian father)
Mahmut Özdemir, member of the SPD
, member of the SPD; awarded the Order of Merit of the Federal Republic of Germany in 1994
, member of the SPD
, member of the SPD
Aygül Özkan, member of the CDU
, member of the SPD
Aydan Özoğuz, member of the SPD
, member of the Greens
, member of the SPD
Ziya Pir, member of the HDP
Filiz Polat, member of the Greens
, member of the FDP
, member of the SPD
Melis Sekmen, member of the Greens
, member of the SPD
, member of the SPD
, member of the SPD; chairman of the Türkische Gemeinde in Deutschland (2014–present)
, member of the Left 
, member of the Left
, member of the SPD
Ismail Tipi, member of the CDU
, member of the Greens
, member of the Greens
, member of the FDP
, former member of the SPD and current member of the CDU 
Derya Türk-Nachbaur, member of the SPD
, member of the Greens
, member of the Greens
, member of the SPD
, spokesman of the ruling CDU/CSU group in the German Bundestag
, member of the CDU
, member of the DEVA
, chairman of the Turkish-founded political party BIG
, member of the SPD
Gülistan Yüksel, member of the SPD
, former member of the SPD; deputy chairman of the UID (2013–15)

Religion
 
 

, scholar of Islam; chairman of the Turkish-Islamic Union for Religious Affairs (2012–17)
, former chairman of the Coordinating Council of the Christian-Islamic Dialogue (2003–08)
Seyran Ateş, lawyer and feminist; founder of the Ibn Rushd-Goethe mosque (Turkish mother and Kurdish father) 
, religious scholar, imam, and co-founder and managing director of the Maimonides Jewish-Muslim educational institute
, chairman of the Islamic Community Millî Görüş (2001–02)
, chairman of HASENE International (2012–present)
Mustafa Özcan Güneşdoğdu, Qur'an reciter
, co-founder of the Alhambra Society
Antuan Ilgit, Catholic Jesuit priest (converted from Sunni Islam)
, chairman of the Dialogue and Education Foundation; co-founder of the House of One - one of the world's first houses of prayer for Islam, Christianity and Judaism 
, chairman of the Islamic Council for the Federal Republic of Germany
, former chairman of the Islamic Council for the Federal Republic of Germany
, executive chairwoman and project manager of the "Sozialdienst muslimischer Frauen" (SmF e.V.)
, scholar of Islam and imam; former spokesman of the Coordination Council of Muslims in Germany
, chairman of the Turkish-Islamic Union for Religious Affairs
, chairman of the Islamic Community Millî Görüş (2005–13)
, former chairman of the Turkish-Islamic Union for Religious Affairs (DITIB)
, activist in interreligious dialogue
Bülent Uçar, islamic scholar

Royalty
Deniz Kaya, Princess of Bavaria (married to Prince Leopold of Bavaria's youngest son Prince Konstantin Eugen Alexander Max-Emanuel Maria Ludwig Ferdinand Leopold of Bavaria)
Ra'ad bin Zeid, Head of the Royal Houses of Iraq and Syria (Turkish mother)
Alexandra Zhukovskaya, daughter of Vasily Andreyevich Zhukovsky and Countess of the Russian Empire (half Turkish and half Russian father and German mother)

Sports

 
 
 

 

 
 
 
 
 
 
 
 
 
 
 
 
 
 
 
 
 
 
 
 
 
 
 
 
 
 
 
 
 
 
 
 
 
 

 
 
 
 
 
 
 
 
 
 
 
 
 
 
 
 
 
 
 
 

 Abdulkadir Kalender, karate master

, football player 
Tunay Açar, football player
Murat Adigüzel, football player
Berkan Afşarlı, football player
Dilan Ağgül, football player
Mahir Agva, basketball player 
, volleyball trainer
Kaan Akça, football player
Murat Akça, football player
Alper Akçam, football player
Sinan Akdag, ice hockey defenceman
Onur Akdoğan, football player
Aykut Akgün, football player
Mehmet Akgün, football player
, football player 
Abdulsamed Akin, football player
Serhat Akın, football player
Atakan Akkaynak, football player
İsmet Akpınar, basketball player 
Taşkın Aksoy, football manager and former football player 
Orhan Aktaş, football player
, boxer
, football player 
Ufuk Akyol, football player
Erhan Albayrak, football manager and former football player 
Uğur Albayrak, football player
Berkan Algan, football player 
Selçuk Alibaz, football player
Deniz Almas, sprinter (Turkish father and German mother)
Ünal Alpuğan, football player
Salih Altın, football player
Volkan Altın, football player
Koray Altınay, football player
Tevfik Altındağ, football player
Halil Altıntop, football player
Hamit Altıntop, football player
Burak Altıparmak, football player 
Drahşan Arda, world's first female football referee 
, boxer 
, futsal player 
Ahmet Arslan, football player
Ensar Arslan, football player
Firat Arslan, boxer
Tolgay Arslan, football player
Volkan Arslan, football coach and former football player
Jyhan Artut, darts player 
Hakan Aslantaş, football player
Serkan Atak, football player
Ismail Atalan, football manager
, football player 
, basketball coach 
Barış Atik, football player
Osman Atılgan, football player
Engin Atsür, basketball player (Turkish father and a German mother)
Kerim Avcı, football player 
Deniz Aycicek, football player
Levent Ayçiçek, football player (Turkish father and a German mother)
İbrahim Aydemir, football player
Selim Aydemir, football player
Semih Aydilek, football player
Anıl Aydın, football player
Erhan Aydın, football player
Mehmet Can Aydin, football player 
, swimmer 
Okan Aydın, football player
Oğuzhan Aydoğan, football player
Taylan Aydoğan, football player
Ercan Aydogmus, football player
Necat Aygün, football player
Şahin Aygüneş, football player
Kaan Ayhan, football player
Onur Ayık, football player
Deniz Aytekin, football referee 
Can Ayvazoğlu, volleyball player 
Bilal Aziz, football player (Turkish Lebanese origin) 
, karateka
Sezer Badur, football player 
Yohannes Bahçecioğlu, football player
Feride Bakır, football player
Sinan Bakış, football player
Alper Balaban, football player
Orkan Balkan, football player
Hakan Balta, football player
Deniz Barış, football player 
, football player
Barbaros Barut, football player
Atif Bashir, football player (Turkish German mother)
Barış Başdaş, football player 
, football player 
Muhittin Baştürk, football player
Yıldıray Baştürk, football player
Malik Batmaz, football player
, football player
Ensar Baykan, football player
Mithat Bayrak, Olympic wrestler 
Durmuş Bayram, football player 
Engin Baytar, football player
Efkan Bekiroğlu, football player
Abdulkadir Beyazıt, football player
Ferhat Bıkmaz, football player 
Oğuzhan Bıyık, football player
Ali Bilgin, football player
Burak Bilgin, football player
, football player
Atilla Birlik, football player
Murat Bosporus, wrestler 
Can Bozdoğan, football player
Gökhan Bozkaya, football player
Mehmet Boztepe, football player 
İsmail Budak, football player
, taekwondoin 
Ufuk Budak, football player 
Erol Bulut, football player
, football player
Onur Bulut, football player
İrfan Buz, football manager and former football player
Kerem Bülbül, football player
Marvin Sinan Büyüksakarya, football player
Emre Can, football player
Görkem Can, football player 
Müslüm Can, football player
Ahmet Canbaz, football player
Fatih Candan, football player
, pool player
Erdem Canpolat, football player 
Onur Capin, football player 
Ahmet Cebe, football player
, football player 
Hakan Cengiz, football coach and former football player
, bodybuilder
Ali Ceylan, football player
, boxer 
, kickboxer 
Tolcay Ciğerci, football player 
Tolga Ciğerci, football player
Daniyel Cimen, football manager and football player
, football player
Can Coşkun, football player 
Ecem Cumert, football player
, wrestler 
Hamza Çakır, football player 
Hakan Çalhanoğlu, football player
Kerim Çalhanoğlu, football player
Muhammed Çalhanoğlu, football player
Serkan Çalık, football player
Taşkın Çalış, football player 
Gökhan Çalışal, football player
Kaan Çaliskaner, football player
Nizamettin Çalışkan, football player
Halet Çambel, fencer; the first Muslim woman to compete in the Olympic Games
Tarık Çamdal, football player
Ali Çamdalı, football player
Burak Çamoğlu, football player
, football player
, football player
Ekin Çelebi, football player
Erdal Çelik, football player
, taekwondo practitioner
Mete Çelik, football player
Musa Çelik, football player
Neco Çelik, football player
 Okan Aydın
, football player; he was the first blind footballer to score the goal of the month in August 2018
, football player
Onur Çenik, football player
Ferhat Çerçi, football player
, football player 
Berk Çetin, football player
Şahverdi Çetin, football player
, taekwondo athlete
Hikmet Çiftçi, football player
Orkan Çınar, football player
Şamil Çinaz, football player
Yusuf Çoban, football player
Bilal Çubukçu, football player
Berkay Dabanlı, football player
Ümit Davala, assistant manager of Galatasaray S.K. and former football player
, e-athlete 
Gülşen Degener, carom billiards player
, bodybuilder 
Ersin Demir, football coach and former football player
Mete Kaan Demir, football player
, football player
Kerem Demirbay, football player
, football player
, football player 
Mithat Demirel, basketball player
Yeşim Demirel, football player
Ünal Demirkıran, football player
Uğur Demirkol, football player
Ahmet Dereli, football player
Okan Derici, football player
Volkan Dikmen, football player
, basketball player 
Eren Dinkçi, football player
Selin Dişli, football player
Abdullah Doğan, football player
Deniz Doğan, football player
Hüzeyfe Doğan, football player
İshak Doğan, football player
Muhammed Ali Doğan, football player 
Mustafa Doğan, football player 
Pakize Gözde Dökel, football player
Sara Doorsoun, football player (Turkish mother and Iranian father) 
Murat Doymus, football player
Taylan Duman, football player
, football player
Burcu Düner, football player
, football player 
İlkay Durmuş, football player
Ahmet Dursun, football player
Serdar Dursun, football player
Kasim Edebali, American football player (Turkish German mother and African American father)
Cem Efe, football manager and former football player
Hasan Egilmez, football manager
Volkan Eğri, football player
Yasin Ehliz, ice hockey player
Mehmet Ekici, football player
Volkan Ekici, football player
Baris Ekincier, football player 
Ahmet Engin, football player
, football player
Tuğrul Erat, football player   
Aykut Erçetin, football player 
Alparslan Erdem, football player
, futsal player 
Lena Erdil, windsurfer (Turkish father and German mother)
Okan Erdoğan, football player
Ömer Erdoğan, football player
Ümit Ergirdi, football player
Helga Nadire İnan Ertürk, football player
Sertan Eser, football player
Pierre Esser, football player
Muhsin Ertuğral, football manager 
Erkan Eyibil, football player
Malik Fathi, football player (Turkish father and German mother)
Cem Felek, football player
Engin Fırat, football manager
Serkan Fırat, football player
Benjamin Fuchs, football player (Turkish mother and Austrian father)
, futsal and football player
Emrehan Gedikli, football player
Turgay Gemicibasi, football player
, football referee
Ayhan Gezen, football player
Serkan Göcer, football player
Ali Gökdemir, football player 
Berkant Göktan, football player
Turgay Gölbaşı, football player
Anil Gözütok, football player
Lukas Gottwalt, football player
Sergio Gucciardo, football player (Turkish father and Italian mother)
Dilaver Güçlü, football player
Faruk Gül, football player
Gökhan Gül, football player
, football player 
Bilal Gülden, football player
Rabia Gülec, Olympic taekwondo practitioner
Tahir Güleç, Olympic taekwondo practitioner
Semih Güler, football player
, football player
Ceyhun Gülselam, football player
Neşat Gülünoğlu, football player
Sinan Gümüş, football player
Gökhan Gümüşsu, football player 
İlkay Gündoğan, football player
Selim Gündüz, football player
Berkant Güner, football player 
Çetin Güner, football player
Ali Güneş, football player
Serdar Güneş, football player
Umut Güneş, football player
, football player 
Mustafa Güngör, rugby player
Koray Günter, football player
Emre Güral, football player
, basketball coach 
Ahmet Gürleyen, football player
Cenk Güvenç, football player
Günay Güvenç, football player
Sercan Güvenışık, football player
Göksu Hasancik, football player
, football player
Tayfur Havutçu, football player
Özer Hurmacı, football player
Fatma Işık, football player
Cem Islamoglu, football player
Şenol İbişi, football player
, football player
Uğur İnceman, football player
Cenk İşler, football player
Deniz Kadah, football player
Cagatay Kader, football player
Hasan Ali Kaldırım, football player
, football player 
Fuat Kalkan, football player
, football player 
Murat Kalkan, football player
, football player
Özge Kanbay, football player
, football player
Burak Kaplan, football player 
, football player
Cihan Kaptan, football player
Fatma Kara, football player
Mehmet Kara, football player
Arzu Karabulut, football player
Aydın Karabulut, football player
Cem Karaca, football player
, carambola player
, football player 
, football player
Kenan Karaman, football player
, football player (Turkish Syrian origin) 
Ümit Karan, football manager and former football player
, football player 
Atakan Karazor, football player
Özgür Kart, football player
Sinan Karweina, football player
Yusuf Kasal, football player
Fatih Kaya, football player
Güngör Kaya, football player
Hasan Kaya, football player
, football player
Saffet Kaya, football player
Nurettin Kayaoğlu, football player
Hasret Kayikçi, football player
Burhanettin Kaymak, football player 
Oğuzhan Kefkir, football player
Umut Kekıllı, football player
, badminton 
Erdal Keser, football player 
Polat Keser, football player 
Serdar Kesimal, football player
, football manager and former football player 
Erdal Kılıçaslan, football player
Fatih Kıran, football player
Ferhat Kıskanç, football player
, wrestler 
Lucky Kid, wrestler 
Muhammed Kiprit, football player
Abdul Kizmaz, football player 
Bertul Kocabaş, football player 
Kenan Kocak, football player
Yasin Kocatepe, football player
Cengiz Koç, heavyweight boxer
Filiz Koç, football player 
Süleyman Koç, football player
Celaleddin Koçak, football player
Guido Koçer, football player
Umut Koçin, football player 
Özkan Koçtürk, football player
Çağla Korkmaz, football player
Serhat Koruk, football player
Tayfun Korkut, football player
, football player
Serhat Kot, football player
Bahattin Köse, football player 
Tevfik Köse, football player
, football player
Cüneyt Köz, football player
Oktay Kuday, football player
Ahmet Kulabas, football player
Burakcan Kunt, football player 
Mehmet Kurt, football player
Okan Kurt, football player
Sinan Kurt (1995), football player
Sinan Kurt (born 1996), football player
Ahmet Kuru, football player
Büşra Kuru, football player
Taygun Kuru, football player
Ahmed Kutucu, football player
, football player 
Mert Kuyucu, football player
, football player 
Enes Küç, football player
Gökhan Lekesiz, football player
Yunus Mallı, football player
İlhan Mansız, football player 
Sümeyye Manz, Olympic taekwondo practitioner
Erkan Martin, football player
Ersen Martin, football player
Cemil Mengi, football player
Levent Mercan, football player
Patrick Mölzl, football player (Turkish father and German mother)
Emre Nefiz, football player
, football player
Faruk Namdar, football player 
Ali Odabas, football player
Barış Odabaş, football player 
Muhayer Oktay, football player
Volkan Okumak, football player
Samed Onur, football player
Mahir Oral, boxer
Selin Oruz, field hockey player
Timur Oruz, field hockey player
Filiz Osmanodja, chess player (Turkish Bulgarian origin)
, football player
Erhan Önal, football player
Barış Örücü, football player
Noyan Öz, football player
Barış Özbek, football player
Ufuk Özbek, football player
, glider pilot 
, football player 
Berkay Özcan, football player
Salih Özcan, football player
Furkan Özçal, football player
Özgür Özdemir, football player
, boxer 
, basketball player 
, boxer 
Aykut Özer, football player
, football player
Abdulkadir Özgen, football player
, football player 
Mesut Özil, football player
Can Özkan, football player
Mustafa Özkan, football player
Cihan Özkara, football player
Yasin Öztekin, football player
Levin Öztunalı, football player (Turkish father and German mother)
Aykut Öztürk, football player
Emre Öztürk, football player
Erdal Öztürk, football player
Erkan Öztürk, football player
Kurtulus Öztürk, football player
Sezer Öztürk, football player 
Tanju Öztürk, football player
, basketball player 
Ali Pala, football player
Mustafa Parmak, football player 
Melike Pekel, football player
Tayfun Pektürk, football player
, football player
İris Rosenberger, Olympic swimmer (Turkish mother and German father) 
Jasmin Rosenberger, swimmer (Turkish mother and German father)
Kemal Rüzgar, football player
Erol Sabanov, football player (Turkish Bulgarian origin)
Ahmet Sağlam, football player
Görkem Sağlam, football player
Murat Sağlam, football player
Mahir Sağlık, football player
, football player 
Murat Salar, football manager and former football player
Nazım Sangaré, football player (Turkish mother and Guinean father)
Sercan Sararer, football player
, basketball player
Adem Sarı, football player
Halil Savran, football player
Tekin Sazlog, football player
, football player 
Lucas Scholl, football player (Turkish German father and German mother)
Mehmet Scholl, football player (Turkish father and German mother) 
, boxer
Can Serdar, football player
Suat Serdar, football player
, football player 
Yusuf Soysal, football player
Rahman Soyudoğru, football player
Kubilay Sönmez, football player
, futsal and football player
Fırat Suçsuz, football player
Dilara Özlem Sucuoğlu, football player
Aytaç Sulu, football player
Abdullah Elyasa Süme, football player
Asiye Özlem Şahin, boxer 
Hülya Şahin, boxer 
Kenan Şahin, football player
Nuri Şahin, football player
Olcay Şahan, football player 
Selçuk Şahin, football player
Sinan Şamil Sam, heavyweight boxer
Busem Şeker, football player
Eren Şen, football player
Utku Şen, football player
Ömer Şişmanoğlu, football player
Turgay Tapu, football player 
Varol Tasar, football player
Serdar Tasci, football player
, football player
Şebnem Taşkan, football player
Berkan Taz, football player
Servet Tazegül, taekwondo
Selim Teber, football player
Sinan Tekerci, football player
, poker player 
, football player
Ogün Temizkanoğlu, football player
Mahmut Temür, football player
Erkan Teper, boxer 
Uğur Tezel, football player
Esra Sibel Tezkan, football player
Ömer Tokaç, football player
Deran Toksöz, football player
Ömer Toprak, football player
, football player
Azad Toptik, football player
Tunay Torun, football player
, football player 
Cenk Tosun, football player
Murat Tosun, football player 
, boxer 
Ünal Tosun, football player
Tufan Tosunoğlu, football player  
, amateur boxer
Gökhan Töre, football player
Enes Tubluk, football player
, football player 
, football player
Levent Tuncat, Olympic taekwondo practitioner
Firat Tuncer, football player
Emre Turan, football player
Olcay Turhan, football player
, karateka
Dilara Türk, football player
Suat Türker, football player
Haluk Türkeri, football player
İbrahim Türkkan, football player
Cem Türkmen, football player
Burak Uça, football player 
Duygu Ulusoy, Olympic skier 
Deniz Undav, football player
Dilara Uralp, Olympic sailor 
Oktay Urkal, Olympic boxer 
Meryem Uslu, kickboxer
Soner Uysal, football manager and former football player 
Tugay Uzan, football player
Ömer Uzun, football player
, boxer
Ebru Uzungüney, football player
, football player
Hasan Ülker, football player 
Tolga Ünlü, football player
Volkan Ünlü, football player
Onur Ünlüçifçi, football player
Bahtiyar Can Vanlı, football manager 
Deniz Vural, football player
Cansu Yağ, football player
Eser Yağmur, football player
Güven Yalçın, football player 
Robin Yalçın, football player
Taner Yalçın, football player
Meryem Yamak, football player 
Volkan Yaman, football player
Aycan Yanaç, football player
Viola Yanik, wrestler (Turkish father and German mother)
Timur Yanyali, football player 
Serhat Yapıcı, football player 
Aylin Yaren, football player
, e-athlete 
Mithat Yavaş, football player
Ferhat Yazgan, football player
Zafer Yelen, football player
Müslüm Yelken, football player 
Gülnur Yerlisu, taekwondo practitioner
Tennur Yerlisu, taekwondo practitioner
Samed Yeşil, football player
, football player
Erdoğan Yeşilyurt, football player
Atilla Yildirim, football player 
Aygün Yıldırım, football player
, football player 
, boxer 
Özkan Yıldırım, football player
Ramazan Yıldırım, football player
, football player 
Fuat Yıldız, Olympic wrestler 
Hakkı Yıldız, football player
Rıfat Yıldız, Olympic wrestler 
Deniz Yılmaz, football player 
Fatih Yılmaz, football player 
Mahmut Yılmaz, football player
Mert Yılmaz, football player
, football player
Ozan Yılmaz, football player
Sefa Yılmaz, football player
Uğur Yılmaz, football player
Yasin Yılmaz, football player
Yusuf Yılmaz, football player
Sertan Yiğenoğlu, football player
, futsal player 
Mehmet Yozgatlı, football player
Ersin Zehir, football player
Serhan Zengin, football player
Furkan Zorba, football player

Victims of crime

 
 
, regarded as one of the first known victims of right-wing extremist violence in the Federal Republic of Germany
Tuğçe Albayrak, victim murdered in Offenbach am Main after intervening on behalf of two young women who were being harassed by a man
, believed to have been shot by a right-wing extremist 
Sevda Dağ, killed in the 2016 Munich shooting 
Hüseyin Dayıcık, killed in the 2016 Munich shooting (Turkish Western Thracian origin)
Diren Dede, an exchange student in the United States who was shot dead in Missoula, Montana 
, 56-year-old man attacked by two neo-Nazis; his death led to demonstrations against right-wing extremism 
, 19-year-old student attacked by three neo-Nazi German brothers; Ekşi's funeral in November, 1991, was attended by 5,000 people
, missing 10-year-old girl in 1999 which triggered the largest search operation in Hamburg since the Second World War 
Satır family, seven people died and another 23 were injured from the 
Susanna Feldmann, a 14-year-old girl who was raped and killed in 2018 in Wiesbaden by an asylum seeker from Iraqi Kurdistan (her father was Turkish and her mother was Jewish-Russian)
Mevlüde Genç, German ambassador for peace who lost two daughters, two granddaughters and a niece in the 1993 Solingen arson attack 
, victim killed during a series of xenophobic murders by the neo-Nazi terrorist group National Socialist Underground (NSU) 
Selçuk Kiliç, killed in the 2016 Munich shooting 
Murat Kurnaz, victim of human rights abuses; detained in Kandahar and then the Guantanamo Bay detention camp 
Can Leyla, killed in the 2016 Munich shooting 
, victim  killed during a series of xenophobic murders by the neo-Nazi terrorist group National Socialist Underground (NSU) 
Enver Şimşek, victim killed during a series of xenophobic murders by the neo-Nazi terrorist group National Socialist Underground (NSU) 
, victim killed during a series of xenophobic murders by the neo-Nazi terrorist group National Socialist Underground (NSU) 
, victim of a murder by the PKK terrorist group
, victim killed during a series of xenophobic murders by the neo-Nazi terrorist group National Socialist Underground (NSU)
, victim killed during a series of xenophobic murders by the neo-Nazi terrorist group National Socialist Underground (NSU)

"Wall victims" (Maueropfer) at the Berlin Wall

Cengaver Katrancı, an 8-year-old boy who drowned in the river Spree in 1972; West Berlin fire department could not intervene after they unsuccessfully attempted to obtain permission for the entry into the river. An East German fireboat and a tanker were present but did not take the rescue operation.
, a 5-year-old boy drowned in the river Spree in 1975; West Berlin police and fire brigade were not allowed to intervene because of the state border running along the bank. Çetin received no help from East Berlin either.

Others
36 Boys, criminal gang active from 1987 to the mid-1990s
, awarded the Order of Merit of the Federal Republic of Germany in 2007 for her commitment to the integration of Turkish women and her commitment to the German Red Cross
Bahtiyar Duysak, Twitter employee who deactivated Donald Trump's account on November 2, 2017
Semra Ertan, set herself on fire in protest against racism, specifically, against the treatment of Turks in Germany
, largest German gaming live streamer on Twitch (Turkish mother and German father)
, YouTuber

See also 
Turks in Germany
List of German locations named after people and places of Turkish origin
Türkenstraße ("Turks Street")
List of Germans

References

Turkish diaspora in Germany
Turkish
Germans
Turkish